Dracaena arborescens, synonym Sansevieria arborescens, is a succulent plant native to Kenya and Tanzania.

Description
Dracaena arborescens grows long stems (over 60 cm), with thick, flat, succulent leaves.

It very closely resembles the related Dracaena bagamoyensis. However, the leaves of D. arborescens are wider (over 25 mm) and less brittle.

References

arborescens
Flora of Kenya
House plants
Flora of Tanzania